Wood Lawn, also known as Woodlawn, is a plantation house built in 1836 and listed on the National Register of Historic Places. The house was built by Dr. George Washington Stinson, one of the first trustees of Davidson College, which was founded in 1837.

History
The original structure consisted of 8 rooms (each with its own fireplace and mantle) on 2 levels off center hallways. The -story staircase features a walnut, spiral-turned handrail believed imported from Charleston, South Carolina. Tradition relates that Dr. Stinson's home was popular among the Davidson College students, not only because he had several eligible daughters, but also because he permitted square dancing, which was strongly discouraged by the Presbyterians of the day. Stinson was a member of Centre Presbyterian Church, where he and his wife are buried. Their son, Edgar Burett Stinson, graduated from Davidson in 1856, fought in the Civil War, and then returned to the family home where he later died. The house remained in the Stinson family until the twentieth century.

In 1981, an upstairs bathroom was installed, heat pumps were placed into service, and the front porch was restored. In 1985, a significant, architecturally compatible addition was made to the back of the house. This included a kitchen and breakfast area, bathroom, and wraparound deck. The nearby carriage house was also constructed at this time, and a potting shed was finished in the early 1990s.

In 2002, the house and its  parcel were purchased for use by a new independent, private school - Woodlawn School. One year later, the house was renovated to serve as the school's administration building, and was dedicated as Stinson Hall, in honor of its builder.

References

External links
 History of Woodlawn School

Plantation houses in North Carolina
Houses on the National Register of Historic Places in North Carolina
Federal architecture in North Carolina
Houses completed in 1836
Houses in Iredell County, North Carolina
National Register of Historic Places in Iredell County, North Carolina